Ernesto Varona (born 7 November 1940) is a Cuban weightlifter. He competed in the men's heavyweight event at the 1964 Summer Olympics.

References

1940 births
Living people
Cuban male weightlifters
Olympic weightlifters of Cuba
Weightlifters at the 1964 Summer Olympics
Place of birth missing (living people)
Pan American Games medalists in weightlifting
Pan American Games silver medalists for Cuba
Weightlifters at the 1967 Pan American Games
20th-century Cuban people